Aaron Motsoaledi was appointed as South Africa's minister of the Department of Home Affairs in May 2019.

Duties 

The department is responsible for:
 Maintenance of the National Population Register (the civil registry), including the recording of births, marriages/civil partnerships and deaths.
 Issuing identity documents and passports.
 Issuing visas for visitors to South Africa (although visa applications pass through embassies or consulates which are part of the Department of International Relations and Cooperation).
 Managing immigration to South Africa and naturalisation of permanent immigrants.
 Handling refugees and asylum seekers in South Africa.
 Controlling ports of entry at land borders, seaports and airports.

Budget

In the 2010 national budget, the department received an appropriation of 5,719.6 million rand, and had 9,375 employees.

Criticisms
A report by the country's Public Service Commission found that the Department of Home Affairs accounted for 22 of the 260 financial misconduct cases for national departments in 2008/9.

In May 2010 it was reported that the Department of Home Affairs had not paid its bill to the Government Printing Works, leading to a delay in the issuance of new passports, and that the department faced lawsuits from "people erroneously declared dead, people whom they failed to issue with identity documents and others arrested after their IDs were used in a fraudulent manner".

There have been reports of corruption within Home Affairs. In February 2010 the department closed one of its Johannesburg offices due to corruption, and in the same year, a number of officials and staff members appeared in court for  alleged corruption and bribery.

In January 2011 the department was criticised for its inefficiency, particularly in regard to processing documents.  Eye Witness News reported that it would take two years to process visa requests from Zimbabwe citizens applying for work and study permits. The Sowetan reported in January 2011 that a South African citizen has unsuccessfully tried to attain an identity document for four years.

References

External links

 

Home Affairs
South Africa
Ministries established in 1910